is a former Japanese footballer who mostly played for Kagoshima United FC.

Club statistics
Updated to 14 April 2020.

References

External links

Profile at Kagoshima United FC

1986 births
Living people
Miyazaki Sangyo-keiei University alumni
Association football people from Kagoshima Prefecture
Japanese footballers
J2 League players
J3 League players
Japan Football League players
FC Kariya players
FC Ryukyu players
Kagoshima United FC players
Association football midfielders
People from Kagoshima